This was the first edition of the tournament.

Marc-Andrea Hüsler won the title after defeating Tomás Martín Etcheverry 6–4, 6–2 in the final.

Seeds

Draw

Finals

Top half

Bottom half

References

External links
Main draw
Qualifying draw

Mexico City Open - 1